Made for Each Other is the debut album by Canadian country music artist Calvin Wiggett. It was released by Royalty Records in 1995. The album peaked at number 14 on the RPM Country Albums chart.

Track listing
"Made for Each Other" – 2:52
"It Isn't Over Till It's Over" – 3:41
"If She Could Only See Me Now" – 3:52
"Love Music Loves to Dance" – 2:22
"We're Not Alone" – 2:51
"Missing You" – 3:41
"Why Should I" – 3:28
"I Know What It's Not" – 3:01
"Homework" – 4:38
"Rock & Roll Heart" – 2:56

Chart performance

References

1995 debut albums
Calvin Wiggett albums
Royalty Records albums